Supplemental Mathematical Operators is a Unicode block containing various mathematical symbols, including N-ary operators, summations and integrals, intersections and unions, logical and relational operators, and subset/superset relations.

Block

Variation sequences
The Supplemental Mathematical Operators block has eight variation sequences defined for standardized variants.  They use  (VS01) to denote variant symbols (depending on the font):

History
The following Unicode-related documents record the purpose and process of defining specific characters in the Supplemental Mathematical Operators block:

See also 
 Mathematical operators and symbols in Unicode

References

Unicode blocks